Robert Moffat (March 5, 1844 – April 25, 1887) was a businessman and political figure in New Brunswick, Canada. He represented Restigouche in the House of Commons of Canada as a Conservative member from 1883 to 1887.

He was born in Campbellton, New Brunswick in 1844, the son of George Moffat, and was educated at the Academy at Annan in Scotland. Moffatt became a merchant in Dalhousie, New Brunswick. In 1876, he married Margaret Sadler. He died in Teeswater, Ontario in 1887 while still in office and his brother George was elected to replace him in the House of Commons.

References 

1844 births
1887 deaths
Conservative Party of Canada (1867–1942) MPs
Members of the House of Commons of Canada from New Brunswick
People from Campbellton, New Brunswick
Canadian people of Scottish descent